Bneid Al-Gar is an area of Kuwait City; it is located in Al Asimah Governorate in Kuwait covering an area of approximately 1,320,220 squared metres.

Etymology
The word "Gar" in Arabic means Tar, and so it was thus named due to the natural discharge of oils. A variant of its transliteration is Bunayd Al-Qar.

Demographics 
According to the public Authority for civil information, as of  30 June 2022, there are 31,111 residents. 2.5% are Kuwaiti and 97.5% are non-Kuwaiti.

References

Populated places in Kuwait
Suburbs of Kuwait City